Hibbertia notabilis, commonly known as Howe guinea-flower, is a species of flowering plant in the family Dilleniaceae and is endemic to ranges near the New South Wales - Victoria border. It is a dense, hairy shrub with ridged branches, egg-shaped to lance-shaped leaves with the narrower end towards the base and yellow flowers arranged singly on the ends of branches with ten to twelve stamens fused at their base, in a single group on one side of two carpels.

Description
The lower surface of the leaves is paler and hairier than the upper surface. There are ten to twelve stamens fused at the base on one side of the two carpels, each carpel with four ovules. Flowering occurs from September to October.

Taxonomy
Hibbertia notabilis was first formally described in 1998 by Hellmut R. Toelken in the Journal of the Adelaide Botanic Gardens from specimens collected in 1984 in the Nadgee Nature Reserve by David Albrecht. The specific epithet (notabilis) means "remarkable" or "noteworthy", referring to the small number of stamens compared to those of the similar H. aspera.

Distribution and habitat
Howe guinea flower grows in open forest on the coastal ranges near the New South Wales - Victoria border, including the Howe Range.

See also
List of Hibbertia species

References

notabilis
Flora of Queensland
Plants described in 2010
Taxa named by Hellmut R. Toelken